Mohammad Hendra Azam bin Mohammad Idris (born 10 August 1988) is a Bruneian professional footballer who plays as a midfielder for DPMM FC and the Brunei national team.

Club career
Hendra began his career with Majra FC where he once scored from the halfway line seconds after the opposing team were celebrating an equalizer and failing to prepare for the restart. He moved to QAF FC in 2009 where he won the Brunei Premier League in his first season with them.

Hendra joined DPMM in 2012, and broke into the first team the following year, scoring in the semi-final of the 2013 Singapore League Cup.

By the 2019 season, Hendra became an integral part of the DPMM squad, starting in most matches as a deep-lying playmaker. On 28 April in the home fixture against Hougang United FC, deep into injury time with the game poised at 2–2, Hendra floated in a 40-yard free-kick which bounced directly into the net to score the game-winning goal. That goal became an important moment in DPMM's season as they became the league champions come September, overcoming Hougang's own title challenge.

DPMM participated in the domestic FA Cup in 2022, and Hendra was instrumental in the team's advancement all the way to the final on 4 December against Kasuka FC. Hendra started in midfield and was victorious with a 2–1 win, bringing DPMM their second FA Cup triumph after last winning the competition in 2004.

International career

Hendra made his debut for the national team in the 2010 AFC Challenge Cup qualification against hosts Sri Lanka in a 1-5 loss, when the whole team was represented by his then club side QAF FC for the tournament. He made further appearances in the AFF Suzuki Cup qualifying rounds of 2012 and 2014.

Hendra saw action for the Under-23s at the 2011 SEA Games in Indonesia. He was selected for the Under-21s in the 2012 Hassanal Bolkiah Trophy a year later, playing in the final for the host's maiden success. Picked again for 2014 as an overage player, he started 3 games as Brunei narrowly failed to advance from the group stage.

After featuring for the DPMM first-team for the last few seasons Hendra was in line to be called up for international duty in June 2019, but declined the invitation to play for Brunei at the 2022 World Cup qualification.

Hendra returned to the international fold in 2022, taking up captaincy and playing in three friendly games against Malaysia, the Maldives and Laos. He led Brunei to qualification for the 2022 AFF Championship with victory over Timor-Leste that November, winning 6–3 on aggregate. The following month in the group stage of the tournament Hendra played two games from the start and two as a substitute as Brunei failed to earn any points in the regional tournament.

Honours

Team
QAF FC
 Brunei Premier League: 2009
DPMM FC
 S.League: 2015
 Singapore League Cup (2): 2012, 2014
 Singapore Premier League: 2019
 Brunei FA Cup: 2022

International
Brunei national under-21 football team
Hassanal Bolkiah Trophy: 2012

Individual
 
  Meritorius Service Medal (PJK) (2012)

Personal life
Hendra's cousins are teammates Azwan Ali Rahman and Abdul Azizi Ali Rahman. His younger brother Hendra Putera is also a footballer who currently plays for Kota Ranger FC as a goalkeeper. 

He used to play and trained football at Kampong Pintu Malim football pitch every afternoon.

References

External links
 
 

1988 births
Living people
Association football midfielders
Bruneian footballers
Brunei international footballers
DPMM FC players
Competitors at the 2011 Southeast Asian Games
Southeast Asian Games competitors for Brunei